The Odeon at Kingstanding, Birmingham, was a 1930s cinema in the Odeon chain. Though closed as a cinema in 1962, the building survives as a bingo hall, and is Grade II listed.

History 

The cinema was constructed between 1935 and 1936 to a symmetrical, modernist, art deco design by Harry Weedon and Cecil Clavering, the latter having joined the former's practice, as an assistant, in 1933. It was commissioned as an independent cinema, and was due to be called "The Beacon", after nearby Barr Beacon, but Oscar Deutsch became involved, and the cinema opened as part of his Odeon chain on 22 July 1935. It was built to serve Kingstanding's new, 4,000-home working-class housing estate and had 968 seats in the stalls and 324 in the circle. The first film was The Lives of a Bengal Lancer, starring Gary Cooper.

The brick building occupies a wedge-shaped site between Kings Road and Kettlehouse Road, overlooking and facing Kingstanding Circle. The centre of the glazed cream and black tile ("faience") frontage features three slender fins, also finished with faience, above a stepped brick parapet. Clavering, inspired by the Lichtburg cinema in Berlin, originally intended that these fins would be topped by a searchlight.

The cinema closed on 1 December 1962, the final film being To Hell and Back, starring Audie Murphy.

Bingo 

The building was refurbished and opened as a Top Rank Bingo Club, subsequently becoming a Mecca Bingo Club, in which use it continues.

It was given Grade-II listed status by English Heritage just 44 years after its erection, on 10 October 1980. It has been described as "one of the best surviving examples of Odeon cinemas in Britain".

References

External links 

 
 Pictures in the English Heritage archives
 Blog post with early photos
 3D virtual model

Kingstanding
Grade II listed buildings in Birmingham
Cinemas in the West Midlands (county)
Odeon Cinemas
Theatres completed in 1935
Streamline Moderne architecture in the United Kingdom
Grade II listed cinemas